Blood and Glory is a feature film that was released to cinema in April 2016 in South Africa. The film, set in 1901, at the end of the Second Boer War, is a period drama that follows Willem Morkel, a Cape rebel (a Boer or Afrikaner) farmer who was captured and sent to a British prisoner of war camp on the Island of Saint Helena in the South Atlantic Ocean. Though suffering under great oppression and hardship, Morkel and his comrades slowly come together to assert their defiance, humanity, and human spirit, especially through the game of rugby.

Blood and Glory is a fictional account, using the backdrop of the Boer War, with some of the places in the plot resembling actual locations from the war. The film's protagonist, Willem Morkel, is loosely based on Sommie Morkel, who went on to play for the South Africa national rugby union team.

The historical authenticity of backdrop events, conditions and attitudes in the plot of the film can be debated, as its depiction of the Boers and the British relies heavily on glorification of the former and vilification of the latter. It is documented that 28,000 Boer women and children, as well as 20,000 black people, died in British concentration camps (Professor Fransjohan, 2011 writing for BBC). The film also makes mention of the scorched earth policy implemented by the British commander-in-chief, General Herbert Kitchener, during the Boer War.

Blood and Glory was co-produced by Dark Matter Studios and Collective Dream Films. It was written and directed by Sean Else (Spud 2, Platteland, 'n Man soos My Pa), and produced by Llewelynn Greeff (Leading Lady and The Unfamiliar) and Henk Pretorius (Leading Lady, Fanie Fourie's Lobola, Wolwedans in die Skemer, Hoofmeisie, Bakgat Trilogy and The Unfamiliar)

Cast 

Blood and Glory includes a strong South African male cast, along with five international actors – a first for a South African film:
 Stian Bam as Willem Morkel
 Charlotte Salt as Katherine Sterndale
 Grant Swanby as Colonel Swannel
 Patrick Connolly as Finn Kelly
 Albert Maritz as Isak Naude
 Michael Richard as Governor Sterndale
 Bok van Blerk as Kommandant Gideon Scheepers
 Altus Theart as Daniel 'Yster' Malherbe
 Jacques Bessenger as Phil Blignaut
 Edwin van der Walt as Marius Prinsloo
 Gustav Gerdener as Eddie Mijnhardt
 Rudy Halgryn as Lt. Butler
 Albert Pretorius as Gawie Mentz
 Jaco Muller as Giepie 'Rot' Nel
 David Louw as Johnny Pienaar
 Nick Cornwall as Sgt.Skirving
 Marno van der Merwe as JJ 'Ratel' Wessels
 Josh Myers as Corporal Evans
 Deon Lotz as Maartens
 De Klerk Oelofse as Wynand Cronjé
 Francios Coertze as Os le Grange
 Benedikt Sebastian as Greyling
 Jonathan Holby as Captain Edwards
 Jandre le Roux as Longtom Van Tonder

The film also features appearances from well-known South African actors Greg Kriek, Clyde Berning, Paul Snodgrass, Carla Else and Andrew Lopescher.

Production

Filming took place during winter in the Western Cape, South Africa in 2015, specifically in the Worcester area and parts of Cape Town. Some sequences were filmed on a boat off the coast of Hout Bay.

Distribution

The film was released on 1 April 2016 in South Africa via distribution partners of the film Ster Kinekor to 51 cinemas nationwide. The film stayed in cinema for a total of 8 weeks, leaving all sites in South Africa on 19 May 2016.

The producers of the film are currently in talks with the following territories for international distribution of Blood & Glory:
 UK and Ireland
 USA & Canada
 Europe
 Asia
 Australia
 New Zealand
 Latin America

References

External links
 
 kykNET
 
 Huisgenoot
 Screen Africa
 Artlink
 GetIt Online – Durban
 Blik
 Media Update
 Pressreader.com
 Rekord East
 Netwerk24
 Pieter Cloete
 Lowvelder
 Weekend Argus
 Rekord Centurion
 The Writing Studio

2010s sports films
South African war drama films
2016 films
Rugby union films
Rugby union in South Africa
Second Boer War films
2010s war films
Prisoner of war films
2016 drama films
Films set on Saint Helena